The Organization of World Heritage Cities (OWHC) is an international non-profit, non-governmental organization of 250 cities in which sites of the UNESCO World Heritage list are located. It was founded in 1993 in Fez, Morocco, during the second International Symposium of World Heritage Cities. The headquarters of the OWHC are located in Quebec City, Quebec, Canada. Altogether the 250 member cities of the OWHC have a population of more than 130 million.

History 
During the first International Symposium of World Heritage Cities in Québec City in 1991, the participating 41 cities adopted the Québec City Declaration. This declaration states the desire to build a network of World Heritage Cities.

At the second International Symposium of World Heritage Cities in Fez, Morocco, the OWHC was founded in 1993. 56 participating cities decided on the mission, goals and powers of the organisation. At the Founding General Assembly, the member cities elected the first Board of Directors and Secretary General.

Since the first General Assembly, the member cities have been meeting every two years. Listed below are the years, locations and topics of the previous General Assemblies.
 1995 Bergen (Norway): Communication between World Heritage Cities
 1997 Evora (Portugal): Tourism and World Heritage – Challenges and Opportunities
 1999 Santago de Compostela (Spain): Innovation in the Management of World Heritage Cities
 2001 Puebla (Mexico): Prevention and Protection Measures for World Heritage Cities in Case of Disaster
 2003 Rhodes (Greece)
 2005 Cusco (Peru): Heritage of Humanity, Heritage with Humanity
 2007 Kazan (Russian Federation): Heritage and Economics
 2009 Quito (Ecuador): The revitalization of historic centres: how to involve all social actors?
 2011 Sintra (Portugal): World Heritage Cities and Climate Change
 2013 Oaxaca (Mexico): Heritage Cities, Sustainable Cities
 2015 Arequipa (Peru): World Heritage Cities, Resilent Cities
 2017 Ahmedabad  (India): World Heritage cities
 2017 Asmara (Eritrea): World Heritage cities, Africa's Modernest city

Organization 
Any city may become a member of the OWHC if it possesses the following two characteristics. Firstly the city has to be the location of a living urban fabric of historic or contemporary interest. Its outstanding universal value has been recognized by the UNESCO and therefore has been registered in the World Heritage List. Secondly the city has to adhere to the values of the OWHC.

The General Assembly is the paramount authority of the OWHC. In it the member cities are represented by their mayor. To be able to take part in the General Assembly and have the right to vote the city has to be a member in good standing (pay the annual membership fee). The General Assembly meets every two years. Special Assemblies may be called by members or the Board of Directors.

At the General Assembly the mayors discuss issues concerning the mission and objectives of the OWHC and formulate relevant recommendations to the Board of Directors. The Assembly guides the activities of the Organization, studies and approves the Organization's work program and controls the financial policy of the Organization.

The Board of Directors consists of eight mayors of members in good standing. It is elected by the General Assembly for two years. Directors may be elected two more times and therefore be directors for a maximum of six consecutive years. The Board of Directors meets at least once a year.

Among its duties are the implementation of the requests formulated and the resolutions adopted by the General Assembly and the planning of the organizations activities according to set up priorities. Furthermore, the Board of Directors examines the financial reports, authorizes the annual budget plan, prepares budget estimates and proposes their adoption to the general assembly. The Board of Directors also draws up the organization chart, the recruiting criteria and standards for the personnel of the General Secretariat and performs any other duty that could be assigned to it by the General Assembly. It is empowered to take all the measures required for the administration of the Organization and the attainment of its objectives.

The Board of Directors elects the President of the OWHC from among themselves. He is the chief executive officer of the OWHC and is tasked with the supervision, administration and management of the affairs of the Organization. He represents the OWHC at the national and international levels and binds the Organization in official acts.

The General Secretariat is headed by the Secretary General who is appointed by the General Assembly for a four-year term. He oversees the execution of mandates by the members, the day-to-day administration and personnel management and hiring. He also coordinates the activities of the OWHC, prepares the budget and the financial reports and ensures that the decisions of the Board of Directors and those of the members taken at the General Assembly are carried out.

The General Secretariat is supported in its duties by seven Regional Secretariats. They are groupings of cities that share cultural, linguistic or geographical affinities and/or have the same concerns and needs. Every member city of the OWHC is allowed to be part of one or more regions. The members of one region have to choose a city from among themselves as domicile for the Regional Secretariat, choose a Regional Coordinator and meet at least once a year. They serve as a link between the member cities of their particular region and the General Secretariat.

The seven Regional Secretariats are
 Regensburg (Germany) for the North-West European Region
 Budapest (Hungary) for the Central and Eastern European Region
 Córdoba (Spain) for the South-European and Mediterranean Region
 Valparaiso (Chile) for the Latinamerican and Caribbean Region
 Kazan (Russian Federation) for the Euro-Asian Region
 Tunis (Tunisia) for Africa and the Middle East
 Gyeongju (South Korea) for the Asia-Pacific Region

To support the General Secretariat the Regional Secretariats assist in producing documents intended for members, data collection and the organization of relevant events. They aim to make it possible for each member to participate more extensively in the activities of the Organization, to foster communication and the exchange of information amongst themselves and to promote the development of the Organization and its presence and influence. To accomplish those aims the Regional Secretariats organize activities intended to promote the Organization's values and objectives.

The OWHC has five official languages: English, French, Spanish, Portuguese and Arabic. Of those English, French and Spanish are working languages.

Goals 
During the founding of the OWHC in 1993 the member cities defined the goals and mission the Organization should have in the future. At the fourth General Assembly in Evora (Portugal) in 1997 the OWHC confirmed the Organization's association with the UNESCO and their joint efforts regarding World Heritage Cities in the UNESCO-OWHC agreement.

The OWHC aims for the implementation of the World Heritage Convention (Convention Concerning the Protection of the World Cultural and Natural Heritage adopted by the UNESCO in 1972). It encourages cooperation and exchange of information and expertise among its member cities on both regional and international levels. The OWHC works in close collaboration with other organizations pursuing similar goals while promoting action likely to support the efforts of cities located in developing countries. It assists members to adapt and improve their management methods in relation to the specific requirements of having a site inscribed on the UNESCO World Heritage List. Moreover, the organization ensures better links between research undertaken by specialists and the needs of the local managements. In addition the Organization intends to help develop a sense of solidarity among its member cities and to sensitize the populations to heritage values and their protection.

Tasks and projects 
The OWHC organizes meetings on international and regional levels. In addition to the biennial General Assemblies there are World Congresses, conferences, seminars and workshops. All those meetings deal with the challenges in the realm of management and strategies pertaining to the preservation and development of historic cities. To accomplish its goals the OWHC additionally offers various activities, programs and projects which aim to promote and support the maintenance, recognition and development of world heritage.

Current projects include Youth on the Trail of World Heritage, City2City, The Jean-Paul-L’Allier Prize for Heritage, an International Video Production Competition, the Solidarity day of World Heritage Cities, Mayors&Heritage and Case Studies.

Member cities

Africa
 Agadez
 Cidade Velha
 Dakar
 Grand-Bassam
 Harar Jugol
 Island of Mozambique
Kashusha
 Lamu
 Mombasa
 Saint-Louis
 Timbuktu
 Zanzibar

Arab states
 Aleppo
 Algiers
 Cairo
 Damascus
Erbil
 Essaouira
 Fez
 Ghadames
 Ghardaïa
Jeddah
 Kairouan
 Marrakesh
 Meknes
Muharraq
Rabat
 Sana'a
 Shibam
 Sousse
 Tétouan
 Tunis
 Zabid

Asia and the Pacific
 Ahmedabad
Akko
Aktau (observer)
Amer
 Andong
 Anuradhapura
 Bam
Bergama
 Bhaktapur
Boeun
 Bursa
Buyeo County
 Chengde
 Denpasar
Diyarbakir
Dujiangyan
 Galle
 George Town
 Gianyar
 Gochang County
 Gongju
Goris City (observer)
 Gwangju
 Gyeongju
 Haenam
Hapcheon County
 Hoi An
 Hué
 Hwasun County
Icherisheher
Istanbul
Iksan
 Jerusalem
Jongno-Gu
 Kandy
Karangasem (observer)
 Kathmandu
 Khiva
 Konya
 Kyoto
 Lalitpur (Patan)
 Levuka
 Lijiang
 Luang Prabang
 Macao
 Melaka
 Miagao
 Nara
 Pyay (observer)
Safranbolu
Selçuk
Seongbuk
Singapore
 Surakarta (observer)
Suwon
 Suzhou
 Tel-Aviv-Yafo
 Turkistan
 Vigan
Yangsan
Yazd
Yeongju
Yerevan (observer)

Europe 
 Alcalá de Henares
 Amsterdam
 Angra do Heroísmo
 Aranjuez
 Augsburg
 Avila
 Baeza
 Bamberg
 Banská Štiavnica
 Bardejov
 Bath
 Beemster
 Bergen
 Berlin
Bern
Bernau
 Biertan
Bolgar
 Bordeaux
 Brugge
 Brussels
 Budapest
 Cáceres
 Carcassonne
 Český Krumlov
 Chorá of Patmos
 Coimbra
 Córdoba
 Cuenca
 Derbent
Dessau
 Dubrovnik
 Edinburgh
 Ejmiatsin
 Elvas
 Évora
 Fontainebleau
 Granada
 Graz
 Guimarães
 Hamburg
 Ibiza
Istanbul
 Karlskrona
 Kazan
Kolding
 Kotor
Kraków
 Kutná Hora
 L'viv
 Le Havre
 Lübeck
 Luxembourg
 Lyon
 Mérida
 Modena
 Mont-Saint-Michel
 Moscow
 Mostar
 Nancy
 Naumburg
 Nessebar
 Notodden
 Novgorod
 Ohrid
 Oporto
 Oviedo
 Padula
Palazzolo Acreide
 Paris
 Potsdam
 Prague
 Provins
 Quedlinburg
 Rauma
 Regensburg
 Rhodes
 Riga
 Roros
 Rotterdam
 Saint Petersburg
 Salamanca
 Salzburg
 San Cristóbal de La Laguna
 San Gimignano
 Santiago de Compostela
 Segovia
 Sighisoara
 Sintra
 Split
 Stockholm
 Stralsund
 Strasbourg
 Suzdal
 Tallinn
 Tarragona
 Telč
Telford
Tinn
 Toledo
 Torun
 Trebíc
 Trogir
 Úbeda
 Urbino
 Valletta
 Vatican City
 Vienna
 Vilnius
Vinje
 Visby
 Warsaw
 Wismar
 Yaroslavl
 Zamosc

Americas
 Arequipa
Belo Horizonte
 Brasilia
 Bridgetown
 Camaguey
 Campeche
 Cartagena
 Colonia del Sacramento
 Coro
 Cuenca
Cuernavaca
 Cuzco
 Diamantina
Fray Bentos
 Guadalajara
 Guanajuato
 Havana
 Lima
 Lunenburg
 Mexico City
 Morelia
 Oaxaca
 Olinda
 Ouro Preto
 Panama
 Philadelphia
 Potosí
 Puebla
 Quebec
 Querétaro
 Quito
 Rimac
 Rio de Janeiro
Salvador de Bahia
San Antonio
 San Miguel de Allende
San Pablo Villa de Mitla
 Santa Cruz de Mompox
 São Luís
 St George's
 Sucre
 Tlacotalpan
 Trinidad
Trujillo (observer)
 Valparaíso
 Willemstad
 Xochimilco
 Zacatecas

See also

List of micro-regional organizations

References

 http://www.ovpm.org/
 https://web.archive.org/web/20160305044101/http://www.ovpm.org/sites/ovpm/files/documents/general_by-laws.pdf

Links 

 Cities

Supraorganizations
Organizations based in Quebec City